Mihael is a masculine given name with the same etymology as Michael.

Notable people with the name include:

Mihael Ambrož (1808–1864), Slovenian politician
Mihael Brejc (born 1947), Slovenian politician, Member of the European Parliament
Mihael Frankovitsch, 16th century politician in Slovenia when the country was under the Holy Roman Empire
Mihael Keehl, otherwise known as Mello, a character from the manga and anime series Death Note
Mihael Kovačević (born 1988), Swiss footballer of Croatian descent
Janez Mihael Kuk, 18th century politician in Slovenia when the country was under the Holy Roman Empire
Mihael Mihalev (born 1990), Bulgarian football midfielder
Mihael Mikić (born 1980), Croatian football player
Mihael Milunović (born 1967), Serbian, French and Croatian painter
Mihael Pongračić (born 1993), Croatian footballer
Mihael Preiss, politician of the early 17th century in Slovenia when the country was under the Holy Roman Empire
Mihael Rajić (born 1984), Croatian footballer
Mihael Rosen, politician of the late 16th century in Slovenia when the country was under the Holy Roman Empire
Mihael Stroj (1803–1871), Slovenian painter best known as Michael Stroy
Mihael Vodapiuez, 16th century politician in Slovenia when the country was under the Holy Roman Empire
Mihael Vončina (born 1969), Slovenian footballer
Mihael Zmajlović (born 1978), Croatian economist and politician

See also
 Mihaela
 Mihail

Croatian masculine given names
Slovene masculine given names
Bulgarian masculine given names